The 1884 Grand National was the 46th renewal of the Grand National horse race that took place at Aintree near Liverpool, England, on 28 March 1884.

Finishing order
Note: In the 1880s the only official return was for the first, second, and third-placed horses. The lower finishing order listed is taken from the dedicated sports newspaper, Bell's Life, which published a more detailed account of the race than the syndicated report which appeared in most regional newspapers. However, the finishing positions from fourth must be regarded as unofficial.

Non-finishers

References

 1884
Grand National
Grand National
19th century in Lancashire